Mahfuzul Hasan Bhuiyan is a Bangladeshi architectural photographer.

Career
Bhuiyan completed his Bachelor of Architecture degree from Bangladesh University of Engineering & Technology. He works as a contract photographer of Zuma Press. And co-founder absurd photos Bangladesh. One of the board Director of Image Colleague Society and United States Photographic Alliance.

His work has been published in National Geographic, Earth shots, World Bank Bangladesh, World Bank Blog,
Aristegui News, Mexico, and photoburst.

Awards

1999–2009
 PSA Best of Show- North Georgia Circuit, US, 2009
 PSA Best of Show- Digital Circuit, US, 2009
 PSA Best of Show- Georgia Circuit, US, 2008
 PSA Best of Show- North Georgia Circuit, US, 2007
 PSA Best of Show- Georgia Circuit, US, 2003

2011
 Documentary Award- Humanity Photo Award, China, 2011
 Medal of Excellence- Digital Circuit, US, 2011

2012
 Finalist-Unesco-Unevoc Photo Contest, US, 2012
 STC Gold Medal- 21st Trienberg Super Circuit, Austria, 2012
 Winner- Imagining our Future Together, World Bank, US, 2012

2013
 First Prize- Photographic Angle Photo Contest "Faces", 2013
 PSA Gold Medal- SAM Circuit, India, 2013
 Trophy-Premfoto, Romania, 2013
 First Prize- Health Workers Count Contest, WHO, 2013
 Finalist-"Save the Water" Photo Contest, Australia, 2013
 UPI Gold Medal- EGIAD Municipality Photo Award " Health for All", Turkey, 2013

2014
 First Prize- Ariano Film Festival, Italy, 2014
 PSA Best of Show- Digital Circuit, US, 2014
 Honorable Mention-Manual Rivera Ortiz Foundation Grant, France, 2014
 FIAP Gold Medal- XXXVIII Trofeo Torrets de Fotografia, Spain, 2014
 UPI Gold Medal- PCA Corsica, US, 2014
 First Prize- Photographic Angle Photo Contest "In Pursuit", 2014
 FIAP Gold Medal- Portrait Circuit, Serbia, 2014
 Best Story- SAM Digital Circuit, 2014
 JCM Silver Medal- JCM Circuit, India, 2014
 FIAP Silver Medal- Marmaris Foto Festival, Turkey, 2014
 First Prize- GHF & UNEP Photo Contest " Click, Conserve, Care", India, 2014
 Runner-up- Photographers Forum Magazine Spring Photo Award, US, 2014
 Gold Medal- Asahi Shimbun Photo Contest, Japan, 2014

2015
 UPI Gold Medal & FIAP Bronze Medal, 9th International "Religion in the World and Chimney", Turkey, 2015
 Nomination Award, Humanity Photo Award, China, 2015
 3rd Prize, Co-Op Hot shots, Singapore, 2015
 AFOCER Medal from A Photo Reporter, Spain, 2015
 3rd Prize and Diploma in Daily Life Category, Life Press Photo, Ukraine, 2015
 USPA Gold Medal from SWAN International Contest, US, 2015
 PSA Best of Show- Georgia Circuit (GASO), US, 2015
 2nd Place in Professional Category, International Image Festival (FINI)- "Social Justice", Mexico, 2015
 First Prize & FIAP Gold Medal- 28° Concorso Fotografico Internazionale di San Marino, 2015
 UPI Gold Medal- Portrait Circuit, Serbia, 2015

References

Bangladeshi photographers
Living people
1975 births